Events from the year 1190 in Ireland.

Incumbent
Lord: John

Events
Hugh de Lacy, 1st Earl of Ulster  (~1176 – after December 26, 1242) was replaced as Viceroy of Ireland by Guillaume le Petil. He was later reappointed to serve as viceroy from 1205 to 1210.
Killone Abbey was founded by Donal Mor O'Brien, King of Thomond and Munster.
Knockmoy Abbey was founded as a Cistercian abbey by the King of Connacht, Cathal Crobhdearg Ua Conchobair, in what is now Abbeyknockmoy

Births

Deaths

References